The Mayor of Far North officiates over the Far North District of New Zealand's North Island. The district has been administered by a district council since 1989.

History
The Far North District was formed in the 1989 local government reforms. The inaugural mayor was Millie Srhoj, who served one term from 1989 to 1992. Sue James served two terms from 1992 to 1998. Yvonne Sharp was mayor from 1998 to 2007; she served three terms before being defeated by Wayne Brown. Brown was challenged by former businessman Sir John Goulter in the 2010 local elections but won a second term. John Carter has been the mayor from 2013 to 2022 when he retired.

List of mayors
Mayors of Far North District have been:

List of deputy mayors

References

Far North
 Far North
Far North District